Jagoi, Singai or Bau, is a Dayak language of Borneo. Gumbang dialect may be closer to Tringgus.

Dialects

Bau language is divided into seven dialects, namely:

  Jagoi - notably from Serikin, Stass, Serasot etc., towards Kampung Selampit in Lundu, Sarawak,
 Bratak - used in kupua (kampung/villages) around the Bung Bratak (Mount Bratak),
 Singai - used in the area and villages around the Catholic site of Mount Singai (from Kampung Apar towards kampung Bobak),
 Biroih - used from Kampung Skiat area towards Kampung Seropak and towards Peninjau Lama (Serumbu area) who originated from Mount Podam,
 Krokuang/Krokong - used in the Krokong area in Bau, Sarawak,
 Gumbang - in Gumbang area, and
 Tringgus - in Kampung Tringgus.

References

Languages of Malaysia
Land Dayak languages